Coram is an unincorporated community and census-designated place (CDP) in Flathead County, Montana, United States. The population was 539 in 2010, up from 337 at the 2000 census.

The community was named after William Coram, a lumberman. It began as a logging town on the South Fork of the Flathead River in 1905. Coram boomed between 1948 and 1953, during construction of the nearby Hungry Horse Dam.

Geography
Coram is located in central Flathead County at  (48.417462, -114.045540), on the east side of the Flathead River. U.S. Route 2 passes through the community, leading northeast  to the community of West Glacier and southwest  to Kalispell.

Demographics

As of the census of 2000, there were 337 people, 134 households, and 88 families residing in the CDP. The population density was 296.5 people per square mile (114.1/km2). There were 151 housing units at an average density of 132.9 per square mile (51.1/km2). The racial makeup of the CDP was 93.47% White, 2.67% Native American, 0.89% Asian, 1.19% from other races, and 1.78% from two or more races. Hispanic or Latino of any race were 2.08% of the population.

There were 134 households, out of which 33.6% had children under the age of 18 living with them, 51.5% were married couples living together, 6.7% had a female householder with no husband present, and 34.3% were non-families. 27.6% of all households were made up of individuals, and 7.5% had someone living alone who was 65 years of age or older. The average household size was 2.51 and the average family size was 3.09.

In the CDP, the population was spread out, with 27.0% under the age of 18, 6.8% from 18 to 24, 29.7% from 25 to 44, 27.6% from 45 to 64, and 8.9% who were 65 years of age or older. The median age was 39 years. For every 100 females, there were 113.3 males. For every 100 females age 18 and over, there were 115.8 males.

The median income for a household in the CDP was $22,000, and the median income for a family was $23,125. Males had a median income of $24,188 versus $14,286 for females. The per capita income for the CDP was $18,799. About 12.9% of families and 19.0% of the population were below the poverty line, including 13.0% of those under age 18 and none of those age 65 or over.

References

Census-designated places in Flathead County, Montana
Census-designated places in Montana